Biib Strykers is a Palauan association football club founded in 2012 which played in the Palau Soccer League, the top level league in Palau in the Spring League 2012.

History
Biib Strykers was founded in 2012 as a club to take part in the Palau Soccer League, which started the same year. They finished fourth in their first season of competition in the 2012 Spring League, and are not competing in the Fall League.,

Players

2012 Squad

References

Football clubs in Palau
2012 establishments in Palau